Toured (A Live Album) was a live album by Huntington Beach pop punk band Big Drill Car. The concert was recorded live at New York's CBGB's on September 3, 1991, at the beginning of a nineteen-week tour known as The Batch World Tour, in support of the then-current album Batch, but wasn't released until two years later.

This was the last recording featuring the classic original line-up of Frank Daly, Mark Arnold, Danny Marcroft and Bob Thompson.

Like many Big Drill Car albums, Toured (A Live Album) is currently out of print.

Track listing
(All songs written by Arnold, Daly, Thompson unless otherwise noted)

 "16 Lines" - 3:13
 "Ick" - 2:39
 "Brody" - 2:56
 "In A Hole" (Daly) - 2:23
 "Let Me Walk" - 2:44
 "No Need" - 2:50
 "Annie's Needle" (Daly, Marcroft) - 2:56
 "Reform Before" (Daly) - 2:16
 "Restless Habs" - 2:51
 "If It's Poison" (Daly) - 3:01
 "Big Shot" (Billy Joel) - 3:08

Personnel 
Frank Daly - vocals
Mark Arnold - guitar
Bob Thomson - bass
Danny Marcroft - drums, background vocals
Additional personnel
Brian Lagowski - live systems engineer
Daniel Snow - electronic equipment technician
Anthony Binikos - electronic equipment technician

References

Big Drill Car albums
1993 live albums